Cardfight!! Vanguard G is the fifth season of Cardfight!! Vanguard and the first season of the G series. It aired in Japan from October 26, 2014 to October 4, 2015 for 48 episodes.

Plot
Set 3 years later after the events of Legion Mate, the story follows Chrono Shindou, an apathetic teenager who finds a Vanguard deck and a map in his school locker one day. Following the map, he is led to Card Capital 2, a card shop where he meets Kamui Katsuragi who works part-time there. After being taught how to play Vanguard and winning his first fight against Kamui, Chrono begins his venture in the world of Vanguard. Chrono finds Vanguard enjoyable, so he decides to return to Card Capital 2, where he takes up a quest and becomes a Grade 1 fighter. Then, he meets and fights Kouji Ibuki, who reveals that Chrono is and always has been completely alone. As a result, Ibuki crushes Chrono with no difficulty and refuses to even tell Chrono his name until Chrono becomes stronger. Over the next few days, Chrono meets and Shion Kiba and Tokoha Anjou (although his first encounter with both of them was not so pleasant but they slowly become very good friends). Chrono also makes an acquaintance of Mamoru Anjou, the Kagero clan leader, and Jaime Alcaraz, the Spanish ace of the European League.

FIVA is holding a national tournament, and the only one not excited is Tokoha. As she is the younger sister of Mamoru, people expect her to follow her brother's footsteps. But she wants to carve her own path and is tired of being forced to live up to her brother's legacy. Meanwhile, Chrono is trying to get enough points by doing quests so he can get to Grade 3 in order to enter the tournament. In the end Tokoha decides to enter the tournament as well. Chrono, Shion, and Tokoha try to find team mates for entering the tournament. One day Kamui calls the three of them in Card Capital 2 and informs them that he has registered the three of them as a team for the tournament (he actually didn't but he tricked them). Chrono, Shion and Tokoha get irritated and angry at this news. 

Kamui tests their teamwork through a variety of exercises, but the trio exhibits no sign of team harmony whatsoever. Then, Kamui has the three play against Team Trinity Dragon in a special cardfight in which each team member will switch with another after each turn. Throughout the fight, Chrono, Tokoha, and Shion constantly argue with each other about their playing methods. With excellent synergy, Trinity Dragon wins, leaving Kamui to believe that there is no hope for Chrono's team. Desperate to prove Kamui wrong (although he was really faking it), Chrono, Tokoha, and Shion become determined to make their unnamed team successful. They later name their team Team TRY3 and enter the National Tournament together.

At the regional qualifier, Team TRY3 fights Team Demise. They ultimately turn out to be a very powerful team. Chrono wins against the first fighter of Team Demise (Sugiru Kariya). However, Shion and Tokoha ultimately lose in their respective cardfights. In the aftermath of their defeat Chrono's aunt discovers Chrono's new hobby and reveals the truth behind his father, who disappeared 10 years ago because of Vanguard. Team TRY3 visits the United Sanctuary branch, seeking a rematch with Team Demise. They find that the United Sanctuary branch is turning cardfighters into people obsessed with winning by brain washing them and by forcing them to think that "weakness is a crime". TRY3 is then challenged by the Branch Manager himself. Unbeknownst to Team TRY3, the Branch Manager is doing this to obtain a special unit that was used against him in a cardfight years ago.

During the battle at the United Sanctuary Branch,  Chrono was given a blank card called a Depend Card by Kamui. After the battle at the United Sanctuary Chrono cardfights Kouji Ibuki and wins, the Depend Card transforms into a new unit, Chrono Dran, Kouji then reveals that there are 11 more Depend Cards, and someone is out to get all of them.

Main characters 
The main characters of the series are:
Chrono Shindou (新導 クロノ, Shindō Kurono)
 Voiced by: Mark Ishii (Japanese); Sam Duke (English)

Birthday: September 9

Star Sign: Virgo

Blood Type: A

The main protagonist of the fifth series, "Cardfight!! Vanguard G". He is a lonely teenager who, like Kai, has a tough exterior but is a nice person. Before getting into Vanguard, he was anti-social and wasn't interested in much of anything. However, since getting into Vanguard, his personality underwent a refurbishment. In his debut, he is unfamiliar with the Cardfight!! Vanguard card game due to it not being available to him at the orphanage. His deck is composed of the unique Gear Chronicle clan, which he received from an anonymous person who is later revealed to be Kouji Ibuki. He uses Vanguard as a means to find something to be passionate about. 

 Tokoha Anjou (安城 トコハ, Anjō Tokoha)
 Voiced by: Emi Nitta (G Season 1-3), (Japanese); Emma Duke (English)

Birthday: 17 April

Star Sign: Aries

Blood Type: O

Chrono's classmate and the younger sister of Mamoru. She is a strong Cardfighter but is often compared to her popular brother. She is an eighth grader in the same class as Chrono Shindou. She takes care in giving simple-to-understand lectures to beginners. As Mamoru Anjou's younger sister, she is burdened by the high expectations of others.

 Shion Kiba (綺場 シオン, Kiba Shion)
 Voiced by: Junya Enoki (Japanese); Cole Hanson (English)

Birthday: October 25

Star Sign: Scorpio

Blood Type: A

A popular and athletic schoolmate of Chrono's and a very skilled fencer from a high class. Shion sees himself as a rival to Chrono. As the heir to the Kiba family fortune, he was brought up to be a man befitting the upper class. One day, his fencing classmate lost a card, which Shion accidentally destroyed. During a trip to a card shop to buy a replacement, he noticed a Blue Sky Knight, Altmile, on sale. This was the catalyst for Shion becoming a card-fighter.

 Kamui Katsuragi (葛木 カムイ, Katsuragi Kamui)
 Voiced by: Shizuka Ishikawa (Japanese); Melissa Dorsey (English)

Birthday: September 13

Star Sign: Virgo

A youngster with a big mouth and the skill to back it up. He's very enthusiastic and energetic about Vanguard and doesn't care who his opponent is so long as they are not weak in his eyes. As a testament to his confidence, he will often refer to himself as "The Great Kamui" or "Kamui The Great" while card-fighting (In the Japanese version, Kamui says "ore-sama", which is an audacious way of refer to oneself). He works part-time in Card Capital 2, though he often leaves his post for various reasons, leaving Shin pretty frustrated sometimes. He helped to introduce Chrono Shindou to Vanguard. He serves as a mentor to Chrono Shindou, much like Shin Nitta was to Team Q4, and is responsible for the creation of Team TRY3. He takes a very special interest in Chrono not just because of his mysterious Gear Chronicle deck but wants to help him grow as a cardfighter. 

 Kouji Ibuki (伊吹コウジ, Ibuki Kōji)
 Voiced by: Mamoru Miyano (Japanese); Daegan Manns (English)
 He is the employee of the United Sanctuary branch and Coach of Team Demise. Similar to Kai, he tends to add "the" on his move declarations. He works under the branch manager of United Sanctuary branch Yuichirou Kanzaki. He later betrayed the branch after finding out Kanzaki's ambition and entrusted Chrono with the Depend Card, believing that Chrono could use it. It is later revealed that he is the one who has been sending Gear Chronicle cards to Chrono.

Antagonists 
The antagonists of the series are:
 Yuichirou Kanzaki (神崎 ユウイチロウ, Kanzaki Yūichirō)
 Voiced by: Takehito Koyasu (Japanese); Josh Friesen (English)

The main antagonist of this season and the Branch Chief of United Sanctuary. He is an elitist who believes that "weakness is a crime" and teaches that philosophy to all fighters of the branch. After losing to Chrono, he retired as a branch chief of United Sanctuary. He uses a Shadow Paladin deck.

 Shouma Shinonome (東雲 ショウマ, Shinonome Shōma)
 Voiced by: Akira Ishida (Japanese); Mark Linde (English)

A calm and analytic fighter who defeated Shion in the regional tournament. Unlike Rin, Shouma prefers to make his opponents lose confidence. He was later fired from Team Demise after losing to Shion. He uses a Genesis deck.

 Rin Hashima (羽島リン, Hashima Rin)
 Voiced by: Yui Kondou (Japanese); Caitlynne Medrek (English)

A popular card-fighter due to her strength and beauty, Rin is an arrogant, selfish, and sadistic fighter who uses psychological attacks to enrage or frighten her opponents. She bears a grudge against Mamoru due to a past incident and takes her hatred out on Tokoha. Rin defeated Tokoha at the regional tournament but lost to her at the special match afterwards, causing Rin to quit the team. Rin uses an Angel Feather deck.

 Sugiru Kariya (刈谷 スギル, Kariya Sugiru)
 Voiced by: Masahito Yabe (Japanese); Chris Austman (English)

An arrogant fighter who underestimates his opponents. He lost to Chrono in the regional tournament and was kicked out of Demise as a result. He uses a Link Joker deck.

Theme songs
Opening theme
 "Break It" by Mamoru Miyano (eps. 197-222) (eps. 197-244 in the English dub)
 "Generation!" by JAM Project (eps. 223-244)
Ending themes
  by Misaki Tokura (Izumi Kitta) (eps. 197-209) (eps. 197-244 in the English dub)
 "NEXT PHASE" by Emi Nitta (eps. 210-222)
 "flower" by Ayako Nanakomori (eps. 223-232)
  by Starmarie (eps. 233-244)

Episode list
Individual episodes in G are known as "Turns".

References

2014 Japanese television seasons
2015 Japanese television seasons
Cardfight!! Vanguard